Arthur Probsthain is an independent bookstore based in London, specialising in antique Asian and African books.

History 

The bookstore was started in 1903 by Arthur Probsthain at Bury Place, and now bears his name. It has been located at 41 Great Russell Street, opposite the British Museum, since 1905.

The bookstore has been family owned for nearly a century and is today managed by Arthur Probsthain's nephew, Michael Sheringham. The bookstore claims to be one of the oldest Asian bookstore in London after Bernard Quaritch.

Collection 

The bookstore has some 150,000 books. Notable items in its collection include a handwritten Quran.

The store featured in the 1991 novel The Feather Men by Ranulph Fiennes.

References

External links 
 

Antiquarian booksellers
English booksellers
Independent bookshops of the United Kingdom
Bookshops in London